Unchained and Unhinged is a limited edition book written by American author Joe R. Lansdale. It contains both essays and fictional short stories. This book was published exclusively by Subterranean Press in 2009 and has since sold out.

Table of contents
Introduction-An Adventure in Quick Reading
Lansdale Unchained (essays)
Just Do It
Lansdale Unchained: Robert E. Howard and the world of Almuric
Little Boys Unite 
Typewriter Mystique, the Bull of it
Kuttner Sharpens his Literary Sword
Leslie Whitten: Neglected Master

Lansdale Unhinged (stories) 
Surveillance 
Coat
Dragon Chili: from the Grand Church Cookbook
Big Man: a Fable
Jack's Pecker
Hanging
Little Kitty
Hole
December
Rainy Weather

References

External links

2009 short story collections
Horror short story collections
Essay collections
Short story collections by Joe R. Lansdale
Works by Joe R. Lansdale
Subterranean Press books